Pelatantheria is a genus of flowering plants from the orchid family, Orchidaceae. Its species are distributed across China, Japan, the Indian Subcontinent and Southeast Asia.

Species
Pelatantheria bicuspidata Tang & F.T.Wang - Yunnan, Guizhou, Thailand
Pelatantheria cristata (Ridl.) Ridl. - Thailand, Malaysia, Sumatra
Pelatantheria ctenoglossum Ridl. - Yunnan, Indochina
Pelatantheria eakroensis Haager -  Vietnam
Pelatantheria insectifera (Rchb.f.) Ridl. - Assam, Bangladesh, India, Nepal, Bhutan, Andaman Islands, Myanmar, Thailand, Vietnam 
Pelatantheria rivesii (Guillaumin) Tang & F.T.Wang - Yunnan, Guangxi, Laos, Vietnam
Pelatantheria scolopendrifolia (Makino) Aver. - Japan, Korea, Anhui, Fujian, Jiangsu, Shandong, Sichuan, Zhejiang 
Pelatantheria woonchengii P.O'Byrne - Thailand

Cultivation
Pelatantheria is not commonly found in cultivation and this genus is rarely used in hybridisation. As of February 2022, 11 hybrids have been registered in the International Orchid Register of the Royal Horticultural Society.

See also
 List of Orchidaceae genera

References

 Berg Pana, H. 2005. Handbuch der Orchideen-Namen. Dictionary of Orchid Names. Dizionario dei nomi delle orchidee. Ulmer, Stuttgart

External links

Orchids of Asia
Vandeae genera